The High Banks cup and ring markings are a series of Neolithic or Bronze Age carvings on an outcrop of rock near High Banks farm, 3 km SE of Kirkcudbright, Dumfries and Galloway. They are one of the best collections of cup and ring markings in Galloway.

External links 

 Digital scan of the panel at Scotland's Rock Art Project

References 

Petroglyphs
Archaeological sites in Dumfries and Galloway
Scheduled Ancient Monuments in Dumfries and Galloway